ČSA Flight 511 was a flight operated by an Ilyushin Il-18 that crashed in Igensdorf near Nürnberg on 28 March 1961 while flying across West Germany.

A German investigation commission stated that the primary cause of the accident was pilot error or an autopilot malfunction. Soviet investigators refused this conclusion and stated that the accident was caused by an explosion near the tail of the plane.

On 12 July 1961 another Ilyushin Il-18 operating on the same flight, ČSA OK-511, crashed near Casablanca-Anfa Airport in Morocco, killing all 72 people on board.

References

Aviation accidents and incidents in 1961
1961 in Czechoslovakia
Accidents and incidents involving the Ilyushin Il-18
511
Aviation accidents and incidents in Germany
1961 in West Germany
1960s in Bavaria
March 1961 events in Europe